Apterichtus gracilis is a species of snake eel native to the eastern Atlantic Ocean off the coast of western Africa. It is known to occur on the continental shelf in mud or sand substrates in which it makes its burrows. This species can reach a length of at least  TL.

References

gracilis
Taxa named by Johann Jakob Kaup
Fish described in 1856